Coronado is a locality in Alberta, Canada.

The community takes its name from Coronado, California.

References 

Localities in Sturgeon County